Lahnavesi is a medium-sized lake in the Kymijoki main catchment area. It is located in Mäntyharju, in the Southern Savonia region in Finland.

See also
List of lakes in Finland

References

Lakes of Mäntyharju
Lakes of Pertunmaa